Baron Luke, of Pavenham in the County of Bedford, is a title in the Peerage of the United Kingdom. It was created in 1929 for the businessman George Lawson Johnston. He was the second son of John Lawson Johnston, the founder of Bovril Ltd.  the title is held by his great-grandson, the fourth Baron, who succeeded his father in 2015.  The third baron was one of the ninety elected hereditary peers to remain in the House of Lords after the passing of the House of Lords Act 1999. He sat on the Conservative benches until resigning from the House in 2015.

Barons Luke (1929)
George Lawson Johnston, 1st Baron Luke (1873–1943)
Ian St John Lawson Johnston, 2nd Baron Luke (1905–1996)
Arthur Charles St John Lawson Johnston, 3rd Baron Luke (1933–2015)
 Ian James St. John Lawson Johnston, 4th Baron Luke (b. 1963)

The heir apparent is the present holder's son Samuel Arthur St. John Lawson Johnston (b. 2000).

Arms

References

Kidd, Charles, Williamson, David (editors). Debrett's Peerage and Baronetage (1990 edition). New York: St Martin's Press, 1990.

Baronies in the Peerage of the United Kingdom
Noble titles created in 1929